Francis Bowes Sayre Sr. (April 30, 1885 – March 29, 1972) was a professor at Harvard Law School, High Commissioner of the Philippines, and a son-in-law of President Woodrow Wilson.

Biography

He was born on April 30, 1885.  He graduated from Williams College in 1909 and Harvard Law School in 1912.  At the start of his career, Sayre worked for Wilfred Grenfell's medical mission in Newfoundland, and as an assistant prosecutor in the office of the New York County District Attorney .

On November 25, 1913, Sayre married Jessie Woodrow Wilson (1887–1933), the middle daughter of President Woodrow Wilson, in a ceremony at the White House.  In 1914 he began work as an assistant to the president of Williams College.  He served on the faculty at Harvard Law School from 1917 to 1933, and he received his J.D.S. degree from Harvard in 1918.

He later served as foreign affairs advisor to the government of King Vajiravudh of Siam as successor to American Foreign Affairs Adviser Edward Henry Strobel, Jens Westengard and Eldon James; Assistant Secretary of State, High Commissioner of the Philippines, and U.S. representative to the United Nations Trusteeship Council. While Sayre was Siam's foreign affairs advisor, he was appointed by King Prajadhipok as Siam's representative on the Permanent Court of Arbitration at The Hague. He was awarded the Grand Cross of the Crown of Siam, and was the second American advisor to be awarded the title Phya Kalyanamaitri or "the beautiful in friendship." The first American Adviser in Foreign Affairs, also a Harvard law professor, was Edward Henry Strobel.

Sayre's immediate subordinate in his capacity of Assistant Secretary of State was Alger Hiss.

He died on March 29, 1972, and was buried at Washington National Cathedral.

Legacy

Sayre's son, Francis Bowes Sayre Jr., (1915–2008) was the dean of the National Cathedral in Washington from 1951 until his retirement in 1978. His daughter Eleanor (1916–2001) was an expert on the Spanish painter Goya and served from 1945 to 1984 as a curator at the Boston Museum of Fine Arts.

The Sayre Highway stretching from Cagayan de Oro to Kabacan, Cotabato, in the Philippines was named after him, formerly named Route 3, since he was the one who spearheaded its construction.

References

External links 

 Francis B. Sayre correspondence at Williams College Archives & Special Collections
 Glad Adventure - Autobiography
 

1885 births
1972 deaths
Harvard Law School faculty
Woodrow Wilson family
Members of the Permanent Court of Arbitration
Harvard Law School alumni
High Commissioners to the Philippines
Williams College alumni
American judges of international courts and tribunals
20th-century American judges